She'll Break Your Heart is the debut EP from Toronto alternative rock band, Love Kills. Released in May 2006, the record received airplay on CBC Radio, as well as a positive review from Toronto music publication, Exclaim! magazine. The EP was recorded, written, and produced by the band's guitarist, and vocalist, Pat Rijd in the band's Toronto project-studio.

Track listing
"Ready to Go" – 2:07
"Adeline" – 2:41
"She'll Break Your Heart" – 3:23
"Bad Time" – 3:02
"Jamie" – 3:25
"It Feels So Right" – 5:15
"Two Hearts" – 3:19

Credits
(Words and music by P. Rijd)
 Heather Flood – vocals, tambourine
 Pat Rijd – guitar, vocals
 Tom Flood – guitar, effects
 Mark Bergshoeff – bass guitar
 Jay Talsma – drums

References

External links
 Love Kills's official page for 'She'll Break Your Heart E.P.'
 Exclaim! magazine review of She'll Break Your Heart E.P.

Love Kills (band) albums
2006 EPs